Jish (Jish, Gush Halav) is a local council in Upper Galilee, located on the northeastern slopes of Mount Meron,  north of Safed, in Israel's Northern District.

Jish is the ancient Giscala or Gush Halav, first mentioned in the historical record by the Roman-Jewish historian Josephus, who described it as the home of John of Giscala and the last city in the Galilee to fall to the Romans during the First Jewish–Roman War (War 4:93). Archeological excavations uncovered remains from the Canaanite and Israelite periods; later archaeological finds in Jish include two ancient synagogues, a unique mausoleum and rock-cut tombs from the classical period. Historical sources dating from the 10th-15th centuries describe Jish (Gush Halav) as a village with a strong Jewish presence.

In the early Ottoman era Jish was wholly Muslim. In the 17th century, the village was inhabited by Druze. In 1945, under British rule, Jish had a population of 1,090 with an area of 12,602 dunams. It was largely depopulated during the 1948 Arab–Israeli War, but was resettled not only by the original inhabitants, who were largely Maronite Christians, but also by some Maronite Christians who were expelled from the razed villages of Kafr Bir'im and some Muslims who were expelled from Dallata.

In 2010, the population of Jish was 3,000.

Etymology
Jish is the ancient Giscala. The Arabic name el-Jish is a variation of the site's ancient name Gush Halav in Hebrew, literally "a lump of milk," which may be a reference to either the production of milk and cheese (for which the village has been famous since at least the early Middle Ages) or else to the fertile surroundings, which are well-suited for various forms of agriculture. Other scholars believe the name Gush Halav refers to the light color of the local limestone, which contrasts with the dark reddish rock of the neighboring village, Ras al-Ahmar.

History

Ancient period 
Settlement in Jish dates back 3,000 years. The village is mentioned in the Mishnah as Gush Halav, a city "surrounded by walls since the time of Joshua Ben Nun" (m. Arakhin 9:6). Canaanite and Israelite remains from the Early Bronze and Iron Ages have also been found there.

Classical antiquity

During the Classical period, the town was known as Gischala, a Greek transcription of the Hebrew name Gush Halav. Both Josephus and later Jewish sources from the Roman-Byzantine period mention the fine olive oil for which the village was known. According to the Talmud, the inhabitants also engaged in the production of silk. Eleazar b. Simeon, described in the Talmud as a very large man with tremendous physical strength, was a resident of the town. According to one version of events, he was initially buried in Gush Halav but later reinterred in Meron, next to his father, Shimon bar Yochai. Jerome recorded that Paul the Apostle lived with his parents in "Giscalis in Judea," which is understood to be Gischala.

After the fall of Gamla, Gush Halav was the last Jewish stronghold in the Galilee and Golan region during the Great Jewish Revolt against Rome (66-73 CE), and the home of John of Giscala.

Two ancient synagogues were discovered at Jish. The first was located at the top of the hill, below the current Maronite Church. The second one was discovered at the foot of the hill, close to a spring; one of its columns is inscribed in Aramaic with the name of a particular "Yose son of Tanhum". This synagogue went through several phases of construction and reconstruction, one destruction being dated by excavator Eric M. Meyers to the earthquake of 551. In addition to Jewish structures and burial sites dated to the 3rd through 6th centuries, both Jewish and Christian amulets have also been discovered nearby. Christian artifacts from the Byzantine period have been found at the site. 

According to local tradition, two nearby rock-cut tombs contain the graves of 1st century BCE Jewish sages Shemaiah and Avtalyon.

Middle Ages
Historical sources from the 10th-15th centuries describe it as a large Jewish village and it is mentioned in the 10th century by Arab geographer Al-Muqaddasi. Jewish life in the 10th and 11th centuries is attested to by documents in the Cairo Geniza. In 1172, the Jewish traveler Benjamin of Tudela found about 20 Jews living there. Ishtori Haparchi also attended a megilla reading when he visited in 1322.

Ottoman Empire
In 1596, Jish appeared in Ottoman tax registers as being in the Nahiya of Jira, of the Liwa Safad. It had a population of 71 households and 20 bachelors, all Muslim. The villagers paid taxes on goats and beehives, but most of its taxes were in the form of a fixed sum: total taxes amounted to around 30,750 akçe.

In the 17th century, the village was inhabited by Druze. The Turkish traveler Evliya Çelebi, who passed by the village in 1648, wrote:Then comes the village of Jish, with one hundred houses of accursed believers in the transmigration of souls (tenāsukhi mezhebindén). Yet what beautiful boys and girls they have! And what a climate! Every one of these girls has queenly, gazelle-like, bewitching eyes, which captivate the beholder—an unusual sight.

According to Yitzhak Ben-Zvi, Maronites first settled in Jish during the early 18th century. This may have happened as a result of the Battle of Ain Dara (1711), in which the Qaysis defeated the Yamanis and drove many of them from Mount Lebanon. Ben-Zvi recorded a local tradition, according which two families in the village preceded the Maronite immigration; One of them—the Hashouls, the oldest family in the village— were Maronites of Jewish ancestry and were originally known by the name Shaul.

The Galilee earthquake of 1837 caused widespread damage and over 200 deaths. Three weeks afterward, contemporaries reported "a large rent in the ground...about a foot wide and fifty feet long." All the Galilee villages that were badly damaged at the time, including Jish, were situated on the slopes of steep hills. The presence of old landslides has been observed on aerial photographs. The fact that the village was built on dip slopes consisting of soft bedrock and soil has made it more vulnerable to landslides. According to Andrew Thomson, no houses in Jish were left standing. The church fell, killing 130 people and the old town walls collapsed. A total of 235 people died and the ground was left fissured. At the time, the village was noted as a mixed Muslim and Maronite village in the Safad district.

At the end of the 19th century, Jish was described as a "well-built village of good masonry" with about 600 Christian and 200 Muslim inhabitants.

A population list from about 1887 showed El Jish to have about 1,935 inhabitants; 975 Christians and 960 Muslims.

British Mandate

At the time of the 1922 census of Palestine, Jish had a population of 721—380 Christians and 341 Muslims. The Christians were classified as 71% Maronite and 29% Greek Catholic (or Melchite). By the 1931 census, Jish had 182 inhabited houses and a population of 358 Christians and 397 Muslims.

In the 1945 statistics, Jish had a population of 1,090; 350 Christians and 740 Muslims, and the village spanned 12,602 dunams, mostly Arab-owned.  Of this,  1,506 dunums were plantations and irrigable land, 6,656 used for cereals, while 72 dunams were built-up (urban) land.

Israel
 
Israeli forces captured Jish on 29 October 1948, in Operation Hiram, after "a hard-fought battle." Benny Morris reports allegations that ten prisoners of war, identified as Moroccans fighting with the Syrian Army, and a number of villagers, including a woman and her baby, were murdered. The Israeli prime minister, David Ben-Gurion, ordered an investigation of the deaths but no IDF soldiers were brought to trial.

Elias Chacour, now Archbishop of the Melkite Greek Catholic Church, whose family resettled in Jish, wrote that when he was eight years old he discovered a mass grave containing two dozen bodies.

Many of the residents of Jish forced to leave the village in 1948 fled to Lebanon and became Palestinian refugees. Christians from the nearby town of Kafr Bir'im resettled in Lebanon and Jish, where today they are citizens of Israel, but continue to press for their right of return to their former villages. In October 1950, Israeli forces raided Jish and detained seven suspected smugglers who were stripped, bound, and beaten. They were released without charge.

In December 2010, a hiking and bicycle path known as the Coexistence Trail was inaugurated, linking Jish with Dalton, a neighboring Jewish village. The 2,500 meter-long trail, accessible to people with disabilities, sits 850 meters above sea level and has several lookout points, including a view of Dalton Lake, where rainwater is collected and stored for agricultural use.

Jish is known for its efforts to revive Aramaic as a living language. In 2011, the Israeli Ministry of Education approved a program to teach the language in Jish elementary schools. Maronites in Jish say that Aramaic is essential to their existence as a people, in the same way that Hebrew and Arabic are for Jews and Arabs.

Demographics

Today, 55% of the inhabitants of Jish are Maronite Christians, 10% percent are Melkites and 35% percent are Muslims.

Geography

Jish is located in Upper Galilee, in the Northern district of Israel. The town is close to Mount Meron, the tallest standing mountain of Galilee. Recently, a new road has connected Jish with the nearby Jewish village of Dalton.

Religious sites and shrines
The tombs of Shmaya and Abtalion, Jewish sages who taught in Jerusalem in the early 1st century, are located in Jish. According to tradition, the prophet Joel was also buried there.

According to Christian tradition, the parents of Saint Paul were from Jish. John of Giscala, the son of Levi, was born in Jish. Other churches in Jish are a small Maronite Church that was rebuilt after the 1837 earthquake and the Elias Church, the largest in the village, which operates a convent.

Archaeology

Eighteen archaeological sites have been excavated to date in Jish and vicinity. Archaeologists have excavated two synagogues in use since the Roman and Byzantine periods (3rd to 6th centuries CE). One synagogue is located at the top of the village and the other east of it. On the remains of the upper synagogue, found by Kitchener of the Palestine Exploration Fund, the Melkite Greek Catholic Church of Mar Boutros was built. Jewish-Christian amulets were discovered nearby.

Coins indicate that Jish had strong commercial ties with the nearby city of Tyre. On Jish's western slope, a mausoleum was excavated, with stone sarcophagi similar to those seen at the large Jewish catacomb at Beit She'arim National Park. The inner part of the mausoleum contained ten hewn loculi, burial niches known in Hebrew as kokhim. In the mausoleum, archaeologists found several skeletons, oil lamps and a glass bottle dating to the fourth century CE.

A network of secret caves and passageways in Jish, some of them located under private homes, is strikingly similar to hideaways in the Judean lowlands used during the Bar Kokhba revolt.

See also
Hanna Jubran
Elinor Joseph
Arab localities in Israel
Population displacements in Israel after 1948
Arameans in Israel

References

Bibliography

Gelber, Y. (2001), Palestine 1948, Sussex Academic Press

   (p. 94 ff)

 (reprinted in 1980)

External links

Welcome To Jish (Gush Halav)
Survey of Western Palestine, Map 4: IAA, Wikimedia commons 
Gush Halav Synagogue
 A lintel with an eagle relief from the 3rd century CE in the ancient synagogue in Gush Halav
Photos of the Gush Halav synagogue and church at the Manar al-Athar photo archive

Ancient synagogues
Arab Christian communities in Israel
Arab localities in Israel
Archaeological sites in Israel
Jewish pilgrimage sites
Local councils in Northern District (Israel)
Maronite communities
Melkite Greek Catholic Church in Israel
Ancient Jewish settlements of Galilee